Private Wallace A. Beckwith (February 28, 1843 – November 22, 1929) was an American soldier who fought in the American Civil War. Beckwith was awarded the country's highest award for bravery during combat, the Medal of Honor, for his action at Fredericksburg, Virginia during the Battle of Fredericksburg on December 13, 1862. He was honored with the award on February 15, 1897.

Biography
Beckwith enlisted at New London, Connecticut. For his role in the Battle of Fredericksburg between December 11 and 15, 1862 Beckwith became one of five other Connecticut soldiers of the 21st Connecticut Infantry who were awarded the Medal of Honor for action during the Civil War.

Medal of Honor citation

See also

List of American Civil War Medal of Honor recipients: A–F

References

1843 births
1929 deaths
People of Connecticut in the American Civil War
Union Army soldiers
United States Army Medal of Honor recipients
American Civil War recipients of the Medal of Honor
Military personnel from Connecticut